Louise Ørnstedt (born March 23, 1985) was a Danish backstroke swimmer who competed at the 2000 and 2004 Olympics.

She retired from swimming in August 2007 due to persistent shoulder problems.

See also
List of Nordic records in swimming
List of Danish records in swimming

References

1985 births
Living people
Danish female swimmers
Danish female backstroke swimmers
Swimmers at the 2004 Summer Olympics
Swimmers at the 2000 Summer Olympics
Olympic swimmers of Denmark
Sportspeople from Odense
World Aquatics Championships medalists in swimming
European Aquatics Championships medalists in swimming